The Municipality of Črnomelj is a municipality in southeastern Slovenia. The seat of the municipality is the town of Črnomelj. The municipality is at the heart of the area of White Carniola, the southeastern part of the traditional region of Lower Carniola. It is now included in the Southeast Slovenia Statistical Region.

Settlements

In addition to the municipal seat of Črnomelj, the municipality also includes the following settlements:

 Adlešiči
 Balkovci
 Bedenj
 Belčji Vrh
 Bistrica
 Blatnik pri Črnomlju
 Bojanci
 Brdarci
 Breg pri Sinjem Vrhu
 Breznik
 Butoraj
 Cerkvišče
 Črešnjevec pri Dragatušu
 Čudno Selo
 Dalnje Njive
 Damelj
 Dečina
 Desinec
 Deskova Vas
 Dobliče
 Doblička Gora
 Dolenja Podgora
 Dolenja Vas pri Črnomlju
 Dolenjci
 Dolenji Radenci
 Dolenji Suhor pri Vinici
 Dolnja Paka
 Draga pri Sinjem Vrhu
 Dragatuš
 Dragoši
 Dragovanja Vas
 Drenovec
 Drežnik
 Fučkovci
 Golek
 Golek pri Vinici
 Gorenja Podgora
 Gorenjci pri Adlešičih
 Gorenji Radenci
 Gorica
 Gornja Paka
 Gornji Suhor pri Vinici
 Griblje
 Grič pri Dobličah
 Hrast pri Vinici
 Hrib
 Jankoviči
 Jelševnik
 Jerneja Vas
 Kanižarica
 Knežina
 Kot ob Kolpi
 Kot pri Damlju
 Kovača Vas
 Kovačji Grad
 Kvasica
 Lokve
 Mala Lahinja
 Mala Sela
 Mali Nerajec
 Marindol
 Mavrlen
 Mihelja Vas
 Miklarji
 Miliči
 Močile
 Naklo
 Nova Lipa
 Obrh pri Dragatušu
 Ogulin
 Otovec
 Paunoviči
 Pavičiči
 Perudina
 Petrova Vas
 Pobrežje
 Podklanec
 Podlog
 Prelesje
 Preloka
 Pribinci
 Purga
 Pusti Gradec
 Rim
 Rodine
 Rožanec
 Rožič Vrh
 Ručetna Vas
 Sečje Selo
 Sela pri Dragatušu
 Sela pri Otovcu
 Selce pri Špeharjih
 Sinji Vrh
 Šipek
 Sodevci
 Špeharji
 Srednji Radenci
 Stara Lipa
 Stari Trg ob Kolpi
 Stražnji Vrh
 Svibnik
 Talčji Vrh
 Tanča Gora
 Tribuče
 Tušev Dol
 Učakovci
 Velika Lahinja
 Velika Sela
 Veliki Nerajec
 Vinica
 Vojna Vas
 Vranoviči
 Vrhovci
 Vukovci
 Zagozdac
 Zajčji Vrh
 Zapudje
 Zastava
 Zilje
 Zorenci
 Žuniči

References

External links

Municipality of Črnomelj on Geopedia
Črnomelj municipal site

 
Crnomelj
Crnomelj
1994 establishments in Slovenia